Matthew 9:2 is the second verse in the ninth chapter of the Gospel of Matthew in the New Testament.

Content
In the original Greek according to Westcott-Hort this verse is:
Καὶ ἰδού, προσέφερον αὐτῷ παραλυτικὸν ἐπὶ κλίνης βεβλημένον· καὶ ἰδὼν ὁ Ἰησοῦς τὴν πίστιν αὐτῶν εἶπε τῷ παραλυτικῷ, Θάρσει, τέκνον· ἀφέωνταί σοι αἱ ἁμαρτίαι σου.  

In the King James Version of the Bible the text reads:
And, behold, they brought to him a man sick of the palsy, lying on a bed: and Jesus seeing their faith said unto the sick of the palsy; Son, be of good cheer; thy sins be forgiven thee.

The New International Version translates the passage as:
Some men brought to him a paralytic, lying on a mat. When Jesus saw their faith, he said to the paralytic, "Take heart, son; your sins are forgiven."

Analysis
Cornelius a Lapide comments on the words, "And seeing their faith, ..." which he says is clearly the faith of those who brought the paralytic to Christ. Because when they could not bring him into the house, they carried him up to the roof, although he also adds the faith of the paralytic in the group since Jesus would never have forgiven his sins, "unless he had had faith".

The story presupposes that the infirmity has a spiritual cause, but there is some debate about the connection between sin and physical illness. Both Lapide and Archbishop McEvilly state that the main reason Jesus healed the man was "that He might show that diseases often arise, not so much from natural causes, as from sin. For He forgives the sins first, and then He heals the paralytic; showing that when the cause was taken away, the effect followed." Dale Allison notes that the text in 4QPrNab, a document among the Dead Sea Scrolls, shows that some Jews thought that a person could forgive someone's sins, with healing as the result.

Commentary from the Church Fathers
Chrysostom: "This paralytic is not the same as he in John. For he lay by the pool, this in Capharnaum; he had none to assist him, this was borne on a bed."

Chrysostom: "He does not universally demand faith of the sick, as, for example, when they are mad, or from any other sore sickness are not in possession of their minds; as it is here, seeing their faith;"

Jerome: "On a bed, because he could not walk."

Jerome: "not the sick man’s, but theirs that bare him."

Chrysostom: "Seeing then that they showed so great faith, He also shows His excellent power; with full power forgiving sin, as it follows, He said to the paralytic, Be of good courage, son, thy sins are forgiven thee."

Peter Chrysologus: "Of how great power with God must a man’s own faith be, when that of others here availed to heal a man both within and without. The paralytic hears his pardon pronounced, in silence uttering no thanks, for he was more anxious for the cure of his body than his soul. Christ therefore with good reason accepts the faith of those that bare him, rather than his own hardness of heart."

Chrysostom: "Or, we may suppose even the sick man to have had faith; otherwise he would not have suffered himself to be let down through the roof as the other Evangelist relates."

Jerome: "O wonderful humility! This man feeble and despised, crippled in every limb, He addresses as son. The Jewish Priests did not deign to touch him. Even therefore His son, because his sins were forgiven him. Hence we may learn that diseases are often the punishment of sin; and therefore perhaps his sins are forgiven him, that when the cause of his disease has been first removed, health may be restored."

Notes

References

External links
Other translations of Matthew 9:2 at BibleHub

09:2